Andrew Blain is a British astronomer, and assistant professor at California Institute of Technology.

He is chairman of ALMA North American Science Advisory Committee (ANASAC), as well as a member of the HerMES international consortium.

Awards
2005 Newton Lacy Pierce Prize in Astronomy

Works
The cold universe, Editors Andrew W. Blain, F. Combes, Bruce T. Draine, D. Pfenniger, Yves Revaz, Springer, 2004 
"A Spectrographic Survey of the Submillimeter Galaxy Population", Multiwavelength mapping of galaxy formation and evolution: proceedings of the ESO Workshop held at Venice, Italy, 13–16 October 2003, Volume 2003, Editors Alvio Renzini, Ralf Bender, Springer, 2005, 
"The Nature of Submillimeter Galaxies", Deep millimeter surveys: implications for galaxy formation and evolution, 19–21 June 2000, University of Massachusetts, Amherst, Editors James D. Lowenthal, David H. Hughes, World Scientific, 2001

References

American astronomers
California Institute of Technology faculty
Living people
Year of birth missing (living people)